The Natal pygmy gecko (Coleodactylus natalensis) is a species of South American lizard in the family Sphaerodactylidae.

Etymology
The specific epithet, natalensis, refers to Natal, Rio Grande do Norte, Brazil, the location of its first discovery.

Geographic range
C. natalensis is endemic to the Atlantic Forest of Brazil.

Description

Reproduction
C. natalensis is oviparous. Females probably have a clutch size just one egg.

References

Further reading
Geurgas, Silvia Rodrigues; Rodrigues, Miguel Trefaut; Moritz, Craig (2008). "The genus Coleodactylus (Sphaerodactylinae, Gekkota) revisited: A molecular phylogenetic perspective". Molecular Phylogenetics and Evolution 49: 92–101.
Lima Santos, Roberto (2004). "Life in the leaf litter: the Natal pigmy gecko Coleodactylus natalensis ". Reptilia 37: 52-56.
Lima Santos, Roberto (2004).  "Viviendo entre la hojarasca. El geco pigmeo de Natal Coleodactylus natalensis". Reptilia 50: 56-60.
Lisboa, Carolina M. C. A.; Freire, Eliza M. X. (2012). "Population Density, Habitat Selection and Conservation of Coleodactylus natalensis (Squamata: Sphaerodactylidae) in an Urban Fragment of Atlantic Forest in Northeastern Brazil". South American Journal of Herpetology 7 (2): 181-190.

External links

Coleodactylus
Reptiles of Brazil
Endemic fauna of Brazil
Reptiles described in 1999

fr:Coleodactylus
it:Coleodactylus
pt:Coleodactylus